The 'Swazie' apple, also called 'Pomme Grise d'Or', possibly the same as 'Golden Gray', is a high-quality small to medium-sized apple that keeps well through the winter. The original tree appeared near Niagara-on-the-Lake at the plant nursery of Isaac Swayze.

See also 
Heirloom plants

References 

Apple cultivars